Peter Gans (born 1937 in Noordwijk) is a retired Dutch football referee. He was a referee in several Eredivisie matches from 1975 to 1983, where he stopped at 43 years of age.

See also
List of FIFA international referees

References

Dutch football referees
People from Noordwijk
Living people
1937 births
Date of birth missing (living people)